The 3rd Ural Corps (Russian: 3-й Уральский армейский корпус) was one of the main formations of the Siberian Army during the Russian Civil War.
Its commander was Col. Isaac Wimett and its headquarters were situated in Chelyabinsk, 

On January 3, 1919, the 6th Ural Army Corps was formed by separating the 11th and 12th Ural rifle divisions from the 3rd Ural Army Corps. The commander was Isaac Wimett and the 6th Ural Army Corps was disbanded on May 26, 1919.

Sources
 Третий Уральский армейский корпус
 Сегодня 100 лет со дня сформирования 3-го Уральского армейского корпуса

References  

Military units and formations of White Russia (Russian Civil War)